imc Process Guide is the name of an electronic performance support system (EPSS). The software is developed by e-learning company IMC AG, Saarbrücken.

Process Guide provides context-sensitive help and up-to-date information for software users in case of difficulties with applications. It operates as an employee's personal navigation system that guides users through company and role specific processes.

Differences between EPSS and e-learning

In contrast to conventional formal learning, the user is not uniquely trained before using software, but receives hints, tips and help as soon as a problem occurs when applying a software in everyday work.

The didactic concept takes into account the so-called forgetting curve, or also known as "Ebbinghaus curve" named after the psychologist Hermann Ebbinghaus. The curve describes the high degree of forgetfulness in conventional, formal learning, where only a small part of information is actually moved and therefore saved into the long-term memory of the participants.

The concept is based on the technique of micro learning, where information is divided into small units and the informal learning, which takes place on a day-to-day basis outside the formal educational systems.

EPSS and virtual assistants
Advanced context-sensitive assistance programs like EPSS should not be confused with simple help applications that are usually keyword-triggered. An example for the latter is the well-known, but highly unpopular Clippy. This animated paperclip popped up whenever users typed a certain word or term in Microsoft Office. Clippy was often seen as annoying and removed by Microsoft in 2007. A new generation of virtual assistants, like Microsoft's Cortana uses smarter methods of assessing when and how to offer what help. Help options can appear for instance after a pre-defined time of inaction between two usually connected process-steps, instead of popping up whenever a certain word is typed.

The boundary between online-help from advanced virtual assistants like Microsoft's Cortana or Apple's Siri and EPSS is not always clear. Both can work like a knowledge navigator or GPS for software. But while Cortana and Siri are more software-specific, an EPPS like Process Guide is more organization-specific. The program does not explain how a certain software works, but instead offers assistance in handling different programs that are in use in an organization as a whole.

Cultural context and informal learning
The application is unusual for a software made in Germany. Even if the company now has development studios in the US, the UK, Australia and other countries, the developer has its roots in the e-learning and training industry in Germany. Process Guide supports informal learning and training on the job, while training in Germany traditionally relies heavily on formal learning, especially in manufacturing.

Basic vocational training as an apprentice can last three years and certificates in vocational training have a high reputation in Germany, even compared with graduations. U.S. President Barack Obama recommended the German dual education system as a standard for vocational training in his State of the Union address in 2012. While the so-called dual education system provides "technicians, engineers and skilled workers through a … apparatus of vocational training and technical apprenticeships", it has downfalls when it comes to lifelong learning, as recommended by the OECD and the European Commission.

As well it does not prepare for rapidly changing working conditions, like technological innovations or changes in the legal framework of a profession. In addition, informal training has proven to be efficient. According to Cross, organizations spend 80% of their training budget on formal learning and 20% on informal learning, while informal learning accounts for 80% of the learning success. Unlike in formal training, usually no certificates or diplomas are handed out though.

Application areas

Authors use the so-called "designer component" to create help texts for applications and functions and define process steps. These help texts can be updated easily with a few clicks if software or processes are changing. On user side, the contents are automatically retrieved via a "Guide", as soon as a function is used with a help text archived. The "Guide" can also be opened selectively to lead through an application or process. This context sensitive help through texts, links and videos is intended to reduce the number of errors in everyday work, especially rarely run processes. In particular, this applies for complex processes or software updates.

The software was used in 2013 by the Saarland Ministry for Finances and European Affairs as a part of information technology restructuring of all Saarland ministries. Another example is the usage by the Lutheran parish of Lahti, Finland at training social workers on case management software.

In addition to the usage in software training, the area of compliance is referred to as exemplary area of application. The need for exact compliance with processes and communication channels, specific information requirements as well as specific data protection requirements and legal obligations coincide here and are of particularly serious consequences. Using the "Process Guide" allows for warnings to be displayed during the execution of compliance related processes. The users can be prompted to confirm their understanding, which along with any process deviations, are automatically documented and made available as compliance reports. This is necessary to ensure that users are not only aware of the rules of compliance but also apply them.

Design and user interface

The user interface is based on the Programme Office 2013 by Microsoft. An inbuilt social feedback function allows users to record their screen and send it directly to the help desk. This makes it easier for help desk staff to deal with software problems and to provide help in the right context. In addition to the traditional "On-Premise model", the Process Guide is also available via software as a Service, a part of Cloud Computing.

References

E-learning
Educational technology